Permit may refer to:

Permit (fish), a game fish of the western Atlantic Ocean belonging to the family Carangidae, Trachinotus falcatus
Various legal licenses:
License
Work permit, legal authorization which allows a person to take employment
Learner's permit, restricted license that is given to a person who is learning to drive
International Driving Permit, allows an individual to drive a private motor vehicle in another nation 
Disabled parking permit, displayed upon a vehicle carrying a person whose mobility is  significantly impaired 
Protest permit, permission granted by a governmental agency for a demonstration 
Construction permit, required in most jurisdictions for new construction, or adding onto pre-existing structures
Filming permit, required in most jurisdictions for filming motion pictures and television 
Home Return Permit, Mainland (China) Travel Permit for Hong Kong and Macao Residents 
One-way Permit, document issued by the PRC allowing residents of mainland China to leave the mainland for Hong Kong
Thresher/Permit class submarine, a class of nuclear-powered fast attack submarines in service with the United States Navy
USS Permit (SS-178), a Porpoise-class submarine of the United States Navy
USS Permit (SSN-594), the lead ship of her class of submarine of the United States Navy
Permit (film), a 1979 Pakistani Punjabi film